Carmel Presbyterian Church may refer to:

Carmel Presbyterian Church (Natchez, Mississippi), listed on the NRHP in Mississippi
Mt. Carmel Presbyterian Church (Covington, Tennessee), listed on the NRHP in Tennessee